The Hearst Lumberjacks are a Junior "A" ice hockey team from Hearst, Ontario, Canada, under new ownership for the 2017–18 season.  They are a part of the Northern Ontario Junior Hockey League (NOJHL).  As the Powassan Hawks, the team won two Dudley Hewitt Cups (1992 and 1993).

History
In 2002, the year after the Ontario Hockey League's North Bay Centennials moved to Saginaw, Michigan, North Bay bought the Sturgeon Falls Lynx.  The team was known as the North Bay Skyhawks from 2002 to 2009. In the summer of 2009, the team was renamed the Trappers in the memory of the NOJHA's North Bay Trappers (1962–1982).

Sturgeon Falls Lynx
The Powassan Hawks relocated to Sturgeon Falls, Ontario to be known as the Sturgeon Falls Lynx for the 1994–95 season. The Lynx were sponsored and affiliated by the North Bay Centennials. This meant, most of their equipment was from the Centennials. The Lynx were the third-best team in the NOJHL, behind the Rayside-Balfour Sabrecats and Parry Sound Shamrocks. Sturgeon Falls managed to make the finals in 1996 and 1997, but lost out to Rayside-Balfour on both occasions. In 1999, the Lynx were the considered the second-best team in the NOJHL after the departure of Parry Sound to the OPJHL. Despite the impressive 1999–00 second-place finish, the Lynx were no match for the unbeaten Rayside-Balfour Sabrecats in the league finals. In 2000–01 and 2001–02, the Sturgeon Falls Lynx finished fourth both seasons.

North Bay Skyhawks
Shortly after the North Bay Centennials moved to Saginaw, Michigan, the Sturgeon Falls Lynx immediately left the Sturgeon Falls Arena and took up tenancy at the bigger North Bay Memorial Gardens in the summer of 2002 and became the North Bay Skyhawks. The Skyhawks became immediately dominant, and won three consecutive NOJHL championships from 2003 to 2005. The Skyhawks played host to the 2004 Dudley Hewitt Cup, finishing second. The Skyhawks franchise appeared in the league finals five times from 2003 to 2009.

North Bay Trappers
The North Bay Skyhawks re-branded to the North Bay Trappers for the 2009–10 season. The team's performance did not vary from the Skyhawks, but would not appear in the league finals again until 2012. A year later, the Trappers would win their first league title since 2009 and played host to the 2013 Dudley Hewitt Cup, finishing fourth. As a result of an Ontario Hockey League franchise returning to North Bay, the tournament was almost allocated a second time. The tournament was originally awarded to Sudbury, but backed out. A deal was reached with the city where the renovations would commence at the end of the Dudley Hewitt Cup final. The Trappers had moved across the city to the West Ferris Arena, which was smaller and had under 500 seating capacity. The 2013–14 season marked the last for an NOJHL franchise in North Bay, as a large of majority of the interest was going towards the North Bay Battalion. Owner David Beauchamp was still being bankrolled by former owner Tim Clayden to meet team expenses, after he sold the Trappers and owned the Espanola Rivermen. With the lack of financial means, community support and sponsors, the Trappers ended up leaving North Bay at the end of the season and played their final games in Mattawa. Beauchamp claims the City of North Bay expelled the Trappers, but the city denied this.

Mattawa Blackhawks
In March 2014, the team announced it was relocating to Mattawa, Ontario to become the Mattawa Blackhawks. Owner David Beauchamp was removed by the league in the fall over unpaid ice fees, and the team was in the hands of new ownership (TPA Sports) from Toronto to continue operations. Because of a small arena, the team's existence was questionable, despite tremendous fan support throughout the season. The Blackhawks finished second-to-last, and lost a best-of-three series to the Powassan Voodoos.

Iroquois Falls Eskis
In March 2015, the Abitibi Eskimos were relocating to Timmins and the Mattawa Blackhawks took advantage and relocated to Iroquois Falls to become the second-incarnation of the Eskimos, calling themselves the Iroquois Falls Eskimos. However, over the summer the team name was altered to the "Eskis" to pay homage to the Iroquois Falls Jr. Eskis, who were members of the league from 1999 to 2002. The new team did not adopt the former Jr. Eskis' colours of blue and white, and instead went with the Abitibi Eskimos colours of black, gold, and white.

Despite having the third best attendance in the league the team was sold.

Hearst Lumberjacks
In April 2017, the NOJHL announced that the Eskis' franchise had been transferred to Hearst, Ontario. A new local ownership group led by Jonathan Blier acquired the team from Allan Donnan. The team began play out of the Claude Larose Recreation Centre in the 2017–18 season.

Season-by-season results

Dudley Hewitt cup
Central Canada Jr. A ChampionshipsNOJHL – OJHL – SIJHL – HostRound-robin play with 2nd vs. 3rd in semifinal to advance against 1st in the finals.

Notable alumni
Alex Auld (Sturgeon Falls Lynx)

References

External links
Lumberjack Web Page
Eskis Webpage
NOJHL League

Northern Ontario Junior Hockey League teams
Mattawa, Ontario